Alesia Mikhaylovna Zaitsava (born 14 August 1985) is a Belarusian badminton player. She competed for Belarus at the 2012 Summer Olympics in the women's singles event, but did not advance to the knock-out stage after being defeated by Petya Nedelcheva of Bulgaria and Adriyanti Firdasari of Indonesia in the group stage. She started playing badminton in 1993, and became part of the Belarusian national badminton team in 1996.

Achievements

BWF International Challenge/Series (4 titles, 11 runners-up) 
Women's singles

Women's doubles

Mixed doubles

  BWF International Challenge tournament
  BWF International Series tournament
  BWF Future Series tournament

References

External links 
 

1985 births
Living people
Sportspeople from Brest, Belarus
Belarusian female badminton players
Badminton players at the 2012 Summer Olympics
Olympic badminton players of Belarus
Badminton players at the 2015 European Games
Badminton players at the 2019 European Games
European Games competitors for Belarus